João Victor Dall'Stella Vialle (born 19 August 2002), known as João Vialle, is a Brazilian footballer who plays as a central defender for Athletico Paranaense.

Club career
Born in Curitiba, Paraná, Vialle joined Athletico Paranaense's youth setup in April 2019, from Paraná Clube. He made his first team debut on 3 May 2021, coming on as a half-time substitute for Giva in a 0–1 Campeonato Paranaense away loss against Azuriz.

Vialle made his Série A debut on 9 December 2021, starting in a 1–1 away draw against Sport Recife, as his side fielded an alternative team.

Career statistics

Honours
 Athletico Paranaense
 Copa Sudamericana: 2021

References

External links
Athletico Paranaense profile 

2002 births
Living people
Footballers from Curitiba
Brazilian footballers
Association football defenders
Campeonato Brasileiro Série A players
Campeonato Paranaense players
Club Athletico Paranaense players